Charles John Wright Barton (6 February 1852 – 4 March 1935) was a New Zealand farmer, businessman, mayor and town clerk. He was born in Daventry, Northamptonshire, England, on 6 February 1852. His father died of a fever in Guangzhou five months before Charles was born. His mother Charlotte returned to England soon afterwards to give birth. In 1853, he, his mother and his uncle Henry Kinder emigrated from England to New Zealand on the Northfleet, settling in Auckland.

References

1852 births
1935 deaths
New Zealand farmers
New Zealand businesspeople
English emigrants to New Zealand
Mayors of Hamilton, New Zealand
People from Daventry